Irene May Guest (July 22, 1900 – June 14, 1970), also known by her married name Irene Loog, was an American competition swimmer, Olympic champion, and world record-holder.  She represented the United States as a 19-year-old at the 1920 Summer Olympics in Antwerp, Belgium, where she received a pair of medals.  Guest received her first medal in the women's 100-meter freestyle in which she finished second behind fellow American Ethelda Bleibtrey, earning a silver medal with a time of 1:17.0.  In the women's 4×100 metres freestyle relay, she won a gold medal with U.S. teammates Bleibtrey, Frances Schroth and Margaret Woodbridge in a new world-record time of 5:11.6.

Guest was inducted into the International Swimming Hall of Fame as an "honor pioneer swimmer" in 1990.

See also
 List of members of the International Swimming Hall of Fame
 List of Olympic medalists in swimming (women)
 World record progression 4 × 100 metres freestyle relay

References

External links
 

1900 births
1970 deaths
American female freestyle swimmers
World record setters in swimming
Olympic gold medalists for the United States in swimming
Olympic silver medalists for the United States in swimming
Swimmers from Philadelphia
Swimmers at the 1920 Summer Olympics
Medalists at the 1920 Summer Olympics
20th-century American women
20th-century American people